Andy Timmons (born July 26, 1963) is an American guitarist who has played in the bands Taylor Bay Band, Danger Danger, Pawn Kings, and Andy Timmons Band (ATB). He has also released several solo albums and has worked as a session guitarist.

He has released two CDs on Favored Nations, the first being That Was Then, This Is Now and Resolution on May 2, 2006.

Biography

As guitarist for glam metal band Danger Danger, he toured the world opening for Kiss and Alice Cooper, sold over a million records worldwide, and had two #1 videos on MTV, and amassed a discography that includes seven solo releases that range from guitar instrumentals, to blues, and even a Beatles/Elvis Costello-inspired collection of pop tunes.

Timmons's many collaborations include a live CD with Olivia Newton-John (Timmons has been her music director-guitarist for many U.S. tours), two albums by Kip Winger, recording sessions for Paula Abdul and Paul Stanley, and radio and television jingles. He has also played alongside Steve Vai, Joe Satriani, Paul Gilbert, Eric Johnson, Steve Morse, Mike Stern, Ace Frehley, Ted Nugent, Reb Beach, and Pierre Bensusan, as well as some of his favorite 1960s singing stars such as the Beach Boys, Lesley Gore, and Gordon Waller.

Playing with drummer/bandleader Simon Phillips on four albums between 1997 and 2015, Timmons demonstrated a range extending well beyond rock and pop music, delivering energetic jazz fusion that earned both critical and audience acclaim.

Timmons is a native of Evansville, Indiana. He graduated from Evansville Harrison High School in 1981 and studied jazz guitar at the University of Miami. He currently resides in McKinney, Texas.

The Andy Timmons Band released their new album, entitled "Andy Timmons Band Plays Sgt. Pepper" on October 25, 2011.

Andy also contributed the "Grabbag" music to the video game Duke Nukem Forever in 2011.

In August 2014, Timmons participated in the G4 Experience—a week-long guitar camp—with fellow guitarists Joe Satriani, Paul Gilbert, and keyboardist Mike Keneally.

On the 26th of October 2014, Andy reunited with former Danger Danger band members for the 25th Anniversary of the band, which took place at the Firefest in Nottingham.

On September 30, 2016, the Andy Timmons Band released their new album, Theme from a Perfect World.

Discography

Danger Danger
Danger Danger (1989) (tracks 3 & 7)
Screw It! (1991)
Cockroach (2001, recorded 1993)

Pawn Kings
Andy Timmons and the Pawn Kings (1995)
Andy Timmons and the Pawn Kings Live (1998)

Solo
Ear X-Tacy (1994)
Ear X-Tacy 2 (1997)
Orange Swirl (1998)
The Spoken and the Unspoken (1999)
And-Thology 1 & 2 - The Lost ear-X-tacy Tapes [Compilation] (2000)
That Was Then, This Is Now [Compilation] (2002)
Electric Truth (2022)

Andy Timmons Band
Resolution (2006)
Andy Timmons Band Plays Sgt. Pepper (2011)
Theme from a Perfect World (2016)

with Maylee Thomas
Here Comes the Son - An Acoustic Christmas (2006)

Simon Phillips
Another Lifetime (1998)
Out of the Blue (Live, 1999)
Protocol II (2013)
Protocol III (2015)

Kip Winger
This Conversation Seems Like a Dream (1996)
Songs From The Ocean Floor (2000)

Ted Pearce
Big Metuselah: Human Sacrifice (2000)
Hallelu Et Adonai: Praise The Lord (2005)

References

External links
 Andy Timmons' official website
 Favored Nations' official website

1963 births
Living people
Guitarists from Indiana
American heavy metal guitarists
Danger Danger members
American session musicians
American male guitarists
20th-century American guitarists
Favored Nations artists